VELAM (Véhicule Léger à Moteur, or "light vehicle with motor") was a French  automobile  manufacturer that made VELAM microcars under the licence of the Isetta from the Italian Iso.
Around 5,000 cars were built between 1955 and 1959.

The Velam was featured in the 1957 film Funny Face and the 1962 French film Adieu Philippine.

See also 
 Isetta
 Microcar

External links 
http://microcar.org/carspecs/velamisetta.html
https://web.archive.org/web/20040908024918/http://www.harpin.demon.co.uk/models/velam.htm

Defunct motor vehicle manufacturers of France